Poliopastea auripes is a moth of the subfamily Arctiinae. It was described by Francis Walker in 1854. It is found in Honduras, Guatemala, Panama, Costa Rica and Colombia.

References 

Poliopastea
Moths of Central America
Arctiinae of South America
Moths of South America
Moths described in 1854